Patriarch Theodore of Constantinople may refer to:

 Theodore I of Constantinople, Ecumenical Patriarch in 677–679
 Theodore II of Constantinople, Ecumenical Patriarch in 1214–1216